Hydra is an arcade video game where players are piloting a hovercraft, trying to deliver top secret items while avoiding mines, other hovercraft, and logs. Collect money and fuel to continue. X-Y yoke control.

Gameplay 

In Hydra thieves are trying to steal the treasures from a museum, these artefacts contain secrets to a weapon and it is your job to stop them. The player is issued an experimental speedboat to navigate the rivers in order to retrieve the treasures from checkpoints. There are nine levels of rivers and oceans, while playing the game the player can collect money bags for extra cash and crystals for extra fuel. The obstacles are gun embankments, enemy crafts and other nuisances which will slow you down and you can loose your cargo which will float down stream that you will have to go and collect. At the end of each level the player then drops off the cargo and can then buy upgrades from a shop to improve the Hydra speedboat.

Development and release

Reception 

Robert Jung reviewed the Atari Lynx version of the game which has been published on IGN, he went on to say the game borrowed "heavily from Roadblasters" but he found it fun giving a score of 8 out of 10. Game Zero Magazine reviewed the game giving a score of 82 out of 100.

References

External links 

 Hydra at AtariAge
 Hydra at GameFAQs
 Hydra at Giant Bomb
 Hydra at Killer List of Videogames
 Hydra at MobyGames

1990 video games
Amiga games
Amstrad CPC games
Arcade video games
Atari games
Atari Lynx games
Atari ST games
Commodore 64 games
Domark games
ICE Software games
Moonstone Computing games
Naval video games
NuFX games
Single-player video games
Tengen (company) games
Vehicular combat games
Video games developed in the United States
Video games set in Africa
Video games set in China
Video games set in Cuba
Video games set in Germany
Video games set in Hawaii
Video games set in Japan
Video games set in Mexico
Video games set in the United Kingdom
Video games set in the United States
Video games with alternate endings
ZX Spectrum games